Erzsébet Gulyás-Köteles (3 November 1924 – 16 June 2019) was a Hungarian gymnast who competed in the 1948, 1952, and 1956 Summer Olympics. She died in June 2019 in Budapest at the age of 94.

See also
List of Olympic female gymnasts for Hungary
Hungary women's national gymnastics team

References

External links
 
 
 

1924 births
2019 deaths
Hungarian female artistic gymnasts
Olympic gymnasts of Hungary
Gymnasts at the 1948 Summer Olympics
Gymnasts at the 1952 Summer Olympics
Gymnasts at the 1956 Summer Olympics
Olympic gold medalists for Hungary
Olympic silver medalists for Hungary
Olympic bronze medalists for Hungary
Olympic medalists in gymnastics
Medalists at the 1948 Summer Olympics
Medalists at the 1952 Summer Olympics
Medalists at the 1956 Summer Olympics
Gymnasts from Budapest
20th-century Hungarian women
21st-century Hungarian women